Milligan Gulch, originally known as La Cañada de la Cruz, or Red Canyon, is a valley in Socorro County New Mexico.

References

Valleys of New Mexico
Landforms of Socorro County, New Mexico